Pelli  is the surname of:

 Arttu Pelli (born 1996), Finnish ice hockey
 César Pelli (1926–2019), Argentine architect
 Denis Pelli (born 1954), Professor of Psychology and Neural Science at New York University
 Fulvio Pelli (born 1951), Swiss politician
 Jussi Pelli (born 1954), Finnish modern pentathlete and fencer
 Leemour Pelli (born 1964), American artist

See also
 Pelly (surname)